java.net was a Java technology related community website. It also offered a web-based source code repository for Java projects. It was shut down in April 2017.

History
java.net was announced by Sun Microsystems during JavaOne 2003.

In January 2010, Oracle announced that it will migrate java.net portal to Project Kenai codebase, encouraging users to move their Kenai projects to java.net.

In June 2016, Oracle announced that "the Java.net and Kenai.com forges will be going dark on April 28, 2017."

Javapedia
The Javapedia project was launched in June 2003 during the JavaOne developer conference. It is part of java.net.

The project aims at creating an online encyclopedia covering all aspects of the Java platform. The Javapedia project is openly inspired by Wikipedia.

The prominent differences between Wikipedia and Javapedia include feature restrictions (for example, editing is open to registered users only), software used (TWiki), links (camelCase is used), and content licensing (Creative Commons 1.0 Attribution license).

See also

 Comparison of source code hosting facilities

Notes

External links
 java.net
 Javapedia

Free software websites
Wiki communities
Java platform
Computing websites